Lord's Cove is a town in the Canadian province of Newfoundland and Labrador. The town had a population of 155 in the Canada 2021 Census. Lord's Cove has a rich inshore fishing history and heritage. The town is approximately 65 km southeast of Marystown.

On November 18, 1929, a tsunami, triggered by an offshore earthquake on the Grand Banks, killed Sarah Rennie and her three children, Bernard, Rita and Patrick, and destroyed the fishing property and provisions of most of Lord Cove's fishers.

Lord's Cove is an ideal birdwatching area with established colonies of Leach's storm-petrel and Manx shearwater nearby at Middle Lawn Island. The colony of Manx shearwaters near "the Cove" is the only known North American colony of the burrowing seabird.

On July 20, 2009, the government of Newfoundland and Labrador announced the creation of the Lawn Islands Archipelago Provisional Ecological Reserve which consists of Middle Lawn Island, Offer Island and Columbier Islands. In addition to the large colonies of Manx shearwaters and Leach's storm petrels, the ecological reserve at Lawn Islands will protect a number  of additional breeding seabird species, namely herring gulls, great black backed gulls, black guillemots, black-legged kittiwakes, common murres and Arctic terns.

Sandy Cove beach is located in Lord's Cove.

Demographics 

See also
 Lamaline
 List of cities and towns in Newfoundland and Labrador

References

External links
 1929 Grand Banks Tsunami
 The Grand Banks earthquake and tsunami - CBC Archives
Lord's Cove - Encyclopedia of Newfoundland and Labrador, vol. 3, p. 374-375.

Towns in Newfoundland and Labrador
Fishing communities in Canada